Leptopontiidae is a family of crustaceans belonging to the order Harpacticoida.

Genera:
 Bereraia Huys, 2009
 Ichnusella Cottarelli, 1971
 Leptopontia Scott, 1902
 Notopontia Bodiou, 1977
 Parasewellina Cottarelli, Saporito & Puccetti, 1986
 Prosewellina Mielke, 1987
 Psammopsyllus Nicholls, 1945
 Sewellina Krishnaswamy, 1956
 Syrticola Willems & Claeys, 1982

References

Harpacticoida